Nicholas Carmen Dattilo (March 8, 1932 – March 5, 2004) was an American prelate of the Roman Catholic Church. He served as bishop of the Diocese of Harrisburg in  Pennsylvania from 1990 until his death in 2004.

Biography

Early life 
The oldest of six children, Nicholas Dattilo was born in Mahoningtown, Pennsylvania, to Frank and Emma (née Nocera) Dattilo. He studied for the priesthood at St. Vincent Seminary in Latrobe, Pennsylvania, and St. Charles Borromeo Seminary in Philadelphia.

Dattilo was ordained to the priesthood for the Diocese of Pittsburgh on May 31, 1958. He then served as a parochial vicar at St. Patrick Parish in Canonsburg, Pennsylvania. until 1971, also briefly serving at St. Colman Parish in Turtle Creek, Pennsylvania. He was pastor of Madonna del Castello Parish in Swissvale, Pennsylvania from 1971 to 1981, and of St. Vitus Parish in New Castle. Pennsylvania, from 1981 to 1985. In 1985, Dattilo was named secretary for clergy and pastoral life for the diocese, later becoming its vicar general.

Bishop of Harrisburg 
On November 21, 1989, Dattilo was appointed the eighth bishop of the Diocese of Harrisburg by Pope John Paul II. He received his episcopal consecration on January 26, 1990, from Archbishop Anthony Bevilacqua, with Bishops William Keeler and Donald Wuerl serving as co-consecrators, at St. Patrick's Cathedral in Harrisburg. 

As bishop, Dattilo began a three-year Consultations Process  to assess the needs and resources of the local church in preparation for the next century. This resulted in a major reorganization of parishes and missions, because of populations shifts within the fifteen counties of the diocese. During Dattilo's tenure, the number of parishes was reduced from 120 to 89, resulting in 23 appeals and years of protests.

In 1998, Dattilo established the Ecclesial Lay Ministry Program, a three-year formation program to prepare trained lay leaders. Following the closure of Villa Vianney, he approved construction for a new residence for retired priests in 1999. He also finalized plans for a diocesan conference center, with the groundbreaking ceremony in October 1999.

Death and legacy 
Dattilo was hospitalized in February 2004 for kidney failure, diabetes and heart and respiratory problems. Nicholas Dattilo died at Holy Spirit Hospital in Camp Hill, three days before his 72nd birthday. His funeral Mass was at Good Shepherd Church in Camp Hill, as St. Patrick's Cathedral was undergoing renovations.

On August 1, 2018, Bishop Ronald Gainer, Dattilo's successor as bishop of Harrisburg, announced that the names of every bishop of Harrisburg from 1947 onward—including Dattilo's -- would be removed from any building or room in the diocese named in their honor, due to their failure to protect victims from abuse.

References

1932 births
2004 deaths
People from Lawrence County, Pennsylvania
Roman Catholic bishops of Harrisburg
20th-century Roman Catholic bishops in the United States
21st-century Roman Catholic bishops in the United States
Saint Vincent Seminary alumni
St. Charles Borromeo Seminary alumni